Paul Rudnick (born December 29, 1957) is an American writer. His plays have been produced both on and off Broadway and around the world. He is also known for having written the screenplays for several movies, including Sister Act, Addams Family Values, Jeffrey, and In & Out.

Ben Brantley, when reviewing Rudnick's The Most Fabulous Story Ever Told in The New York Times, wrote that, "Line by line, Mr. Rudnick may be the funniest writer for the stage in the United States today."

Early life 
Rudnick was born and raised in a Jewish family in Piscataway, New Jersey, where his mother, Selma, was a publicist and his father, Norman, was a physicist. Rudnick attended Piscataway High School. He attended Yale College before moving to New York City, where he wrote book jacket copy and worked as an assistant to his friend, the costume designer William Ivey Long. Rudnick began writing for magazines, including Esquire, Vogue, Vanity Fair and Spy.

Plays and novels
Rudnick's first play was Poor Little Lambs, a comedy about a female Yale student's attempt to join The Whiffenpoofs, an all-male singing group. The play's cast included the young Kevin Bacon, Bronson Pinchot, and Blanche Baker. Rudnick then wrote two novels: Social Disease, a satiric tale of New York nightlife in the vein of Evelyn Waugh's Vile Bodies, and I'll Take It, which was a tribute to Rudnick's mother and aunts and their passionate love of shopping. The Chicago Tribune called the book "absolutely hysterical", and The Boston Globe termed it "Flat out hilarious. Sort of what I imagine P. G. Wodehouse would have written after spending some time in Bloomingdale's."

In the late 1980s Rudnick moved into the top floor of a Greenwich Village brownstone, which had once been the 1920s home of the actor John Barrymore. This inspired Rudnick's play I Hate Hamlet, about a young TV star who, as he's about to play Hamlet, is visited by the ghost of Barrymore. The play was produced on Broadway and became notorious when Nicol Williamson, the actor playing Barrymore, began attacking his co-star in a far-too-realistic manner during a dueling scene.

In 1993 Rudnick had a breakthrough with his Off-Broadway hit Jeffrey. At first no theater would produce the play, because it was described as a comedy about AIDS. But after a sold-out run at the tiny WPA Theater in New York City, the show transferred for a commercial run. The play ran from December 31, 1992, to February 14, 1993, at the WPA Theatre. The play transferred to the 
Off-Broadway Minetta Lane Theatre, running from March 6, 1993, to January 16, 1994. Frank Rich, in The New York Times, called Rudnick "a born show-biz wit with perfect pitch for priceless one-liners". Stephen Holden, also in the Times, said that Jeffrey was "Just the sort of play Oscar Wilde might have written had he lived in 1990s Manhattan." Rudnick won an Obie Award, an Outer Critics Circle Award, and the John Gassner Playwrighting Award. The original cast featured John Michael Higgins as Jeffrey, Edward Hibbert, Bryan Batt, and Harriet Harris and was directed by Christopher Ashley.

Rudnick's later plays included The Naked Eye, which depicted an extreme photographer along the lines of Robert Mapplethorpe, and in 1998, The Most Fabulous Story Ever Told, which was inspired by the fundamentalist remark, "God made Adam and Eve, not Adam and Steve." In Rudnick's revisionist take on the Bible, God makes Adam and Steve, along with the first lesbians, Jane and Mabel. While the play was protested by religious groups, it moved for a commercial run, and the New York Daily News said, "You will find yourself laughing uncontrollably throughout the evening."

Rudnick also wrote Valhalla, an epic which entwined the lives of a World War II soldier from Texas with Ludwig, the Mad King of Bavaria; Regrets Only, a drawing room comedy starring Christine Baranski and George Grizzard; and The New Century, a collection of related one-acts, which was produced at Lincoln Center and for which the actress Linda Lavin won a Drama Desk Award. Rudnick has more recently contributed two pieces, The Gay Agenda and My Husband, to the Off-Broadway anthology Standing on Ceremony: The Gay Marriage Plays. My Husband was released by Playing on Air as a radio play on podcast and public radio featuring Michael Urie and Harriet Harris, directed by Claudia Weill.

In September 2017, Rudnick's play Big Night opened at the Kirk Douglas Theatre in Los Angeles, where it played through October. Wendie Malick starred in this Oscar-themed tragicomedy, described by The Hollywood Reporter as "an often amusing but mostly muddled ensemble piece."

Rudnick's new play Guilty Pleasure was scheduled to be produced at the La Jolla Playhouse in the Fall of 2020, but due to the pandemic, will premiere the following Fall, to be directed by Christopher Ashley.

Screenwriting
Rudnick has worked as an uncredited script doctor on films including The Addams Family and The First Wives Club. He was credited as the pseudonym "Joseph Howard" for his work on Sister Act, which was originally intended as a vehicle for Bette Midler; the screenplay went through many changes, and by the time it became re-fashioned for Whoopi Goldberg he refused to have his real name associated with it. He received sole writing credit for Addams Family Values, In & Out, and the screen version of his play Jeffrey. Rudnick's later screenwriting forays included Isn't She Great and the 2004 remake of The Stepford Wives. His script Coastal Elites––a socially-distanced film about the COVID-19 pandemic––was directed by Jay Roach and stars Bette Midler, Dan Levy, Issa Rae, Sarah Paulson, and Kaitlyn Dever. It began airing on HBO on September 12, 2020.

Other writing
In 2011, HarperCollins published I Shudder, a collection of Rudnick's autobiographical essays, some covering his work on stage and screen, interspersed with fictional pieces depicting Elyot Vionnet, a fictional alter-ego. Since 1998, Rudnick has been a frequent contributor to The New Yorker, mostly of over 50 short humor pieces. His work appears in the collections Fierce Pajamas and Disquiet, Please.

In 1988, Rudnick began producing satiric film criticism for Premiere Magazine under the name Libby Gelman-Waxner, a deranged Manhattan wife, mother and "Assistant Buyer of Juniors Activewear." A collection of Libby's columns was published in 1994 under the title If You Ask Me, and Janet Maslin, in The New York Times, wrote that, "Mr. Rudnick weaves many a trenchant thought into Libby's comic screeds." Premiere folded in 2007, but Libby resumed writing a monthly column for Entertainment Weekly in 2011 and occasionally contributes reviews to The New Yorker.

On May 1, 2013, Scholastic published Gorgeous, Rudnick's first young adult novel. Publishers Weekly, in a starred review, said that the book included "writing that's hilarious, profane and profound (often within a single sentence.)" Scholastic also published his second Young Adult novel, It's All Your Fault, which Booklist called "A laugh-out-loud, irreverent tale built on as much snarkiness as sweetness. A riotously good read." His latest novel, Playing The Palace, was published by Berkley on May 25, 2021. The New York Times said, "In Rudnick's effervescent new novel the question isn't whether love will triumph, only how. The answer may make you cheer." Booklist said Playing The Palace is "a fizzy, fun, fresh and fairy-tale like rom-com that will restore readers' faith in true love."

In 2023 Simon & Schuster will publish Rudnick's novel Farrell Covington and the Limits of Style.

Personal life 
Rudnick is openly gay.

Bibliography

Plays and musicals
 Poor Little Lambs (1982)
 I Hate Hamlet (1991)
 Jeffrey (1993)
 The Naked Truth (2004)
 The Most Fabulous Story Ever Told (1998)
 Rude Entertainment (2001)
 Valhalla (2004)
 Regrets Only (2006)
 The New Century (2008)
 Standing On Ceremony: The Gay Marriage Plays (2011)
 Big Night (2017)

Novels
 
 
 
 It's All Your Fault by Paul Rudnick 2016 Scholastic Press
 Playing The Palace 2021 Berkley

Memoirs

Essays and reporting
 
 
 
 
 
 
 
 
 
 
 
 
 
 
———————
Notes

References

External links 

 Paul Rudnick's Official Website
 
Internet Broadway Database
 New Plays And Playwrights - Working in the Theatre Seminar video at American Theatre Wing January 2004
 Paul Rudnick's office, 2007

1957 births
20th-century American dramatists and playwrights
20th-century American novelists
21st-century American dramatists and playwrights
21st-century American novelists
Living people
American male screenwriters

The New Yorker people
People from Piscataway, New Jersey
Piscataway High School alumni
Jewish American dramatists and playwrights
American male novelists
American male dramatists and playwrights
Obie Award recipients
20th-century American male writers
21st-century American male writers
Screenwriters from New Jersey
Writers from New Jersey
Yale College alumni
LGBT Jews
American LGBT screenwriters
20th-century pseudonymous writers
21st-century pseudonymous writers
21st-century American Jews